Aruvikuzhy Waterfalls (not to be confused with Aruvikkuzhy Falls in pathanamthitta, Kerala) is a waterfall in Kottayam district in the Kerala state of India. The waterfall measures about 30 ft in height and active only during monsoon. In summer the river almost dries up.

References 

Waterfalls of Kerala
Geography of Alappuzha district
Tourist attractions in Alappuzha district